Palauni M. Ma Sun, Jr. (born December 21, 1985) is an American football offensive lineman who is currently a free agent.

Early life
Ma Sun was born in Pago Pago, American Samoa and graduated from Kahuku High & Intermediate School of Kahuku, Hawaii in 2003. Ma Sun then attended Fresno City College in Fresno, California and graduated in 2005 with an associate degree in political science. SuperPrep magazine ranked Ma Sun as among the top ten junior college offensive linemen. In 2005, Ma Sun enrolled at the University of Oregon and played two years on the Oregon Ducks football team.

Pro career

Ma Sun signed a free agent contract with the National Football League Washington Redskins in May 2007. More recently he has played arena football with the Spokane Shock and the Chicago Rush.

References

1985 births
American Samoan people of Chinese descent
American sportspeople of Samoan descent
Oregon Ducks football players
Fresno City Rams football players
Boise Burn players
Spokane Shock players
Chicago Rush players
Players of American football from American Samoa
Players of American football from Hawaii
People from Laie
People from Pago Pago
Living people
Hawaii people of Chinese descent